The International Mathematics Research Notices is a peer-reviewed mathematics journal. Originally published by Duke University Press and Hindawi Publishing Corporation, it is now published by Oxford University Press. The Executive Editor is Zeev Rudnick (Tel Aviv University). According to the Journal Citation Reports, the journal has a 2018 impact factor of 1.452, ranking it 40th out of 317 journals in the category "Mathematics". According to SCImago Journal & Country Rank, International Mathematics Research Notices is ranked top 48th of more than 371 internationally circulated journals in the field of mathematics. Since its founding, International Mathematics Research Notices has established a reputation for fast turnaround and outstanding quality.

References

External links 
 

Mathematics journals
Oxford University Press academic journals
Publications established in 1991
Monthly journals
English-language journals